Green Mosque is a historic Ottoman mosque in İznik, Turkey.

The Mosque
One of the earliest examples of Ottoman architecture, the Yeşil Mosque was constructed by order of the Grand Vizier Çandarlı Kara Halil Hayreddin Pasha of Sultan Murad I in Iznik. It was later completed by his son Ali Pasha. The inscription on the mosque gives the date of construction as AH 780-794 (1378-1391), and the name of the architect as Haci bin Musa.

The Yeşil Mosque is located near the Lefke Gate on the eastern edge of the city.
The mosque has a single minaret in the northwestern corner of the building which is decorated with composed glazed terra-cotta green, yellow, turquoise and dark purple coloured tiles. The colourful tiles minaret gives the mosque its name: Yeşil (green in Turkish).

The mosque was damaged in 1922 by the Greek army during the Turkish War of Independence. The mosque was restored between 1956 and 1969.

References

External links
Yesil Cami, Archnet

Gallery

Mosques completed in 1391
14th-century mosques
Ottoman architecture in Turkey
Mosque buildings with domes
Mosques in Iznik
Buildings and structures in Bursa Province
Tourist attractions in Bursa Province